Corinne Allal (born 15 March 1955) is an Israeli rock musician and music producer.

Biography
Corinne Allal was born in Tunisia and immigrated to Israel when she was 8 years old.

Music career
During her military service she played in various bands of the Israeli Defense Forces, including with Yehudit Ravitz. In the 1970s she performed mainly as a guitarist. She released her first album in 1984. The albums Antarctica (1989), Sfat Imi (native tongue, 1990) and Zan Nadir (A Rare Kind, 1992) were produced by Yehudit Ravitz and enjoyed commercial success in Israel. In 2003 she was awarded the Prize of the Israeli Society of Composers and Music Producers (AKUM). Although Allal is considered leftist and lives openly as a lesbian, her music, especially the song Ein li eretz acheret (English: I have no other country) is also very popular among conservative and religious activists and musicians.

References

1955 births
Living people
Musicians from Tunis
People from Netanya
People from Herzliya
Tunisian emigrants to Israel
Israeli people of Tunisian-Jewish descent
Jewish Israeli musicians
Israeli Sephardi Jews
20th-century Israeli Jews
21st-century Israeli Jews
Lesbian Jews
Israeli lesbian musicians
Israeli LGBT singers
Israeli LGBT songwriters
LGBT record producers
Lesbian songwriters
Lesbian singers
Israeli women guitarists
Israeli rock musicians
Israeli women singer-songwriters
20th-century Israeli women singers
21st-century Israeli women singers
20th-century Israeli LGBT people
21st-century Israeli LGBT people